Scopula inficita is a moth of the  family Geometridae. It is found in Indonesia and the Philippines.

Adults are straw/fawn coloured.

Subspecies
Scopula inficita inficita (Flores, Bali, Timor, Pura, Tenimber)
Scopula inficita philippina Prout, 1931 (Philippines, Borneo)

References

Moths described in 1866
inficita
Moths of Asia